The canton of Vire Normandie (before 2021: Vire) is an administrative division of the Calvados department, northwestern France. Its borders were modified at the French canton reorganisation which came into effect in March 2015. Its seat is in Vire Normandie.

It consists of the following communes:

Beaumesnil
Campagnolles
Landelles-et-Coupigny
Le Mesnil-Robert
Noues de Sienne
Pont-Bellanger
Saint-Aubin-des-Bois
Sainte-Marie-Outre-l'Eau
Vire Normandie

References

Cantons of Calvados (department)